Kauppinen is a Finnish surname. Notable people with the surname include:

 Aarne Kauppinen (1889–1927), Finnish artisan, smallholder and politician
 Hannele Kauppinen (born 1955), Finnish singer known by her stage name Taiska
 Marko Kauppinen (born 1979), Finnish ice hockey player
 Juho Kauppinen (born 1986), Finnish accordionist
 Jarkko Kauppinen (born 1992), Finnish biathlete
 Liisa Kauppinen (born 1939), Finnish human rights activist 
 Sean Kauppinen, American video game executive

Finnish-language surnames